Failed terrorism plots are terrorist plots that have either been foiled, uncovered by authorities or failed through mistakes.

2001

Shoe bomb attempt

2002

Wood Green ricin plot

2003

Tyler poison gas plot
The Tyler poison gas plot was a domestic terrorism plot in Tyler, Texas, United States. It was thwarted in April 2003 with the arrest of William J. Krar, Judith Bruey (Krar's common-law wife) and Edward Feltus and the seizure of a cyanide gas bomb along with a large arsenal that included at least 100 other conventional bombs, machine guns, an assault rifle, an unregistered silencer, and 500,000 rounds of ammunition. The chemical stockpile seized included sodium cyanide, hydrochloric acid, nitric acid and acetic acid.

The three individuals were linked to white supremacist and anti-government groups. Feltus was a member of the New Jersey Militia while Krar was suspected of making his living travelling across the country selling bomb components and other weapons to violent underground anti-government groups. Federal authorities had been watching Krar since at least 1995 when ATF agents investigated a possible plot to bomb government buildings, but he was not charged at the time. Since the September 11, 2001 terrorist attacks their attention was focused on middle-eastern terrorist activities and were only alerted to Krar's recent activities by accident when he mailed Feltus a package of counterfeit birth certificates from North Dakota, Vermont and West Virginia, and United Nations Multinational Force and Defence Intelligence Agency IDs. The package was mistakenly delivered to a Staten Island man who alerted police.

On May 4, 2004 Krar was sentenced to 135 months in prison after he pleaded guilty to building and possessing chemical weapons. Ms. Bruey was sentenced to 57 months after pleading to "conspiracy to possess illegal weapons".

2005

Sydney terrorism plot

Five men were arrested in late 2005 in Sydney, Australia and charged over a terrorism-plot they planned between July 2004 and November 2005. Each pleaded not guilty to the charges.  Police searches of their homes discovered instructions on bomb-making, 28,000 rounds of ammunition (including 11,000 7.62×39mm), 12 rifles, militant Islamist literature, and footage of beheadings carried out by Islamists, and also of aircraft crashing into the World Trade Center on 11 September 2001.  According to the prosecution, the men purchased explosive chemicals and guns between July 2004 and November 2005.

The five were found guilty on 16 October 2009 and were jailed on 15 February 2010 for terms ranging from 23 to 28 years. The trial was one of Australia's longest and involved approximately 300 witnesses and 3,000 exhibits, including 18 hours of telephone intercepts and 30 days of surveillance tapes, which has overtaken the record previously held by the liquidation of Bell Group.

2006
2006 transatlantic aircraft plot
2006 Ontario terrorism plot

2007 
2007 Glasgow Airport attack

2009

Raleigh jihad group
 2009 Bronx terrorism plot

Seven men were arrested on July 27, 2009 near Raleigh, North Carolina on charges of participating in a conspiracy to commit "violent jihad" outside the United States. An eighth man named in the indictment, believed to be in Pakistan, has not been arrested. The alleged leader of the group, Daniel Patrick Boyd, was accused of recruiting the other seven men, including two of his sons, to take part in a conspiracy “to advance violent jihad, including supporting and participating in terrorist activities abroad and committing acts of murder, kidnapping or maiming persons abroad.”

At their detention hearings, U.S. Magistrate Judge William Webb ruled that all were to be held without bond until trial.

2010

Ottawa arrests
On 25 August 2010, seven individuals were arrested in Ottawa and London, Ontario on terrorism-related charges. It was the culmination of Project Samosa, a year-long probe by the Royal Canadian Mounted Police, which identified eight members of a cell targeting government buildings on Parliament Hill.

Operation Guava terror plot

Also known as the "London Stock Exchange bomb plot", nine conspirators were arrested in December 2010 for plotting a terrorist attack; they all eventually pleaded guilty, and eight were convicted of engaging in preparation for acts of terrorism. One of the convicts, Usman Khan, had his sentence reduced on appeal by Lord Justice Leveson. He became Cambridge University's "poster boy for Britain's anti-radicalisation strategy", but he went on to perpetrate the 2019 London Bridge stabbing.

2020

Brexit Day bomb plot

On 31 January 2020, the day the United Kingdom was to withdraw from the European Union, the Police Service of Northern Ireland received two anonymous tips that a bomb inside a lorry would be on a ferry heading from Belfast Harbour to Cainryan, Scotland. While the explosive device was not found at the harbour, or detonated, it would be found on 5 February inside a lorry on the Silverwood Industrial Estate in Lurgan, County Armagh, Northern Ireland after a search of 400 lorries; it was then disarmed by a bomb disposal team. While the perpetrator(s) remain unknown, the PSNI suspects the involvement of the Continuity Irish Republican Army, which would make the bombing part of the Dissident Irish Republican campaign.

References

 Plots